Marian Susitz is an Austrian cross-country skier. She represented Austria at the 1988 Winter Paralympics. She competed in cross-country skiing and she won two medals: the silver medal in the women's 3x5 km relay B1-3 event and the bronze medal in the women's short distance 5 km B2 event.

References

External links 
 

Living people
Year of birth missing (living people)
Place of birth missing (living people)
Paralympic cross-country skiers of Austria
Cross-country skiers at the 1988 Winter Paralympics
Medalists at the 1988 Winter Paralympics
Paralympic silver medalists for Austria
Paralympic bronze medalists for Austria
Paralympic medalists in cross-country skiing
Austrian female cross-country skiers
20th-century Austrian women